The hydrazine antidepressants are a group of non-selective, irreversible monoamine oxidase inhibitors (MAOIs) which were discovered and initially marketed in the 1950s and 1960s. Most have been withdrawn due to toxicity, namely hepatotoxicity, but a few still remain in clinical use.

Tranylcypromine, a structurally unrelated MAOI introduced around the same time as the hydrazines, was originally advertised as non-hydrazine as a result of its diminished propensity for causing hepatotoxicity.

List of hydrazine antidepressants

Marketed

 Benmoxin (Neuralex, Nerusil) ‡
 Iproclozide (Sursum) ‡
 Iproniazid (Marsilid) ‡
 Isocarboxazid (Marplan)
 Mebanazine (Actomol) ‡
 Nialamide (Niamid) ‡
 Octamoxin (Ximaol, Nimaol) ‡
 Phenelzine (Nardil)
 Pheniprazine (Catron) ‡
 Phenoxypropazine (Drazine) ‡
 Pivhydrazine (Tersavid) ‡
 Safrazine (Safra) ‡

Legend: ‡ = Withdrawn from the market; † = Partially discontinued; Bolded names indicate major drugs.

Never marketed
 Carbenzide
 Cimemoxin
 Domoxin
 Metfendrazine

Parkinson's
Carbidopa

Tranquillosedative
Centazolone

References

 

Hepatotoxins
Hydrazines
Monoamine oxidase inhibitors